Rainald is a name of a number of historical persons listed in the Domesday Book. The name may refer to:

Rainald of Abingdon
Rainald of Dassel
Rainald Goetz
Rainald Knightley, 1st Baron Knightley
Rainald of Urslingen

References

Disambiguation pages with given-name-holder lists